John Roderick Graham is an American film composer.  He is best known for his film scores to Kingsglaive: Final Fantasy XV and the score for the taiga drama Kirin ga Kuru. He is also known for the scores to The Royal Treatment (film), Bitch Slap, Lange Flate Ballær 2, and American Strays.  He won first prize for Best Original Score for his music in "Alleged" at the Michigan Film Festival, and won Best Soundtrack Album for his score for Long Flat Balls II at the Just Plain Folks awards.

Life and career 
Graham was born in Charlottesville, Virginia. During his youth he studied at Charterhouse School in Surrey, England, studying singing and orchestral writing. Graham began his career singing and playing in bands, while studying traditional orchestral music.  After Charterhouse, Graham pursued his studies at Williams College, Stanford University, and UCLA, focusing more and more on film music over time.

Graham's first film score was written for Full Contact, a film directed by Rick Jacobson, whom he has also worked with at other times, including, most recently, on "The Royal Treatment (film)". He has also worked with James Brolin on "The Royal Hearts," My Brother's War, and Pensacola: Wings of Gold.

Graham also works with Immediate Music, and his music has been featured in the trailers for Avatar, Edge of Darkness,  "Cloudy With a Chance of Meatballs," "Night at the Museum 2: Battle of the Smithsonian" (Fox),  "The Curious Case of Benjamin Button (film)" The Mummy: Tomb of the Dragon Emperor, and others.

On March 8, 2019, it was announced that Graham would be the composer for the 59th taiga drama Kirin ga Kuru. He is the first American composer to score a taiga drama since they began in 1963.

See also
Harald Zwart
James Brolin

References

External links

American film score composers
American male film score composers
People from Charlottesville, Virginia
American music arrangers
Williams College alumni
Living people
University of California, Los Angeles alumni
Stanford University alumni
People educated at Charterhouse School
Year of birth missing (living people)